Nobia AB is a Swedish company which owns many European kitchen-related firms. In 2008 it was the largest producer of kitchen furniture in Europe.

Swedish company Nobia was founded in 1996 and today is the largest kitchen furniture manufacturer in Europe. The company's headquarters are in Stockholm, on whose stock exchange the sharebolag is listed.  Nobia's major regional, national and international brands are present in many European countries. The company specializes in custom built-in kitchens and generates part of its revenue through franchising. In 2003, there was a legal dispute between Nobia and the German kitchen manufacturer Nobilia due to the likelihood of confusion between the two names.

Group Companies

UK Region
 Magnet 
 Magnet Projects
 Gower
 Commodore Design
 CIE

Nordic Region
 HTH
 Invita
 Marbodal
 Myresjökök
 Norema
 Novart
 Sigdal

Continental Europe Region
 Bribus
 EWE-FM
 Optifit
 Pronorm

References

External links
Official Website

Manufacturing companies based in Stockholm
Swedish brands
Kitchen manufacturers
Manufacturing companies of Sweden
Companies listed on Nasdaq Stockholm
Manufacturing companies established in 1996
Swedish companies established in 1996